The Hovnatanyan family (Hovnat'anyanner) was a prominent Armenian family of painters. They include five generations from 17th to 19th centuries. Hovnatanyans are originally from the village of Shorot, Yernjak district in Nakhichevan (now Şurud, Julfa Rayon, Nakhichivan Autonomous Republic). 

They were based in Nakhichevan, Yerevan, Tbilisi, Ejmiatsin, Saint Petersburg and Persia. Most of their works are dedicated to Christianity like other works of their era.

The surname derives from Hovnatan, the Armenian equivalent of Jonathan.

Family members
Naghash Hovnatan (Նաղաշ Հովնաթան) (1661-1722) - founder of the family; poet, artist, miniaturist, wall-painter, and a church clerk
Harutyun Hovnatanyan (Հարություն Հովնաթանյան) (18th century) – artist and a wall-painter
Hakob Hovnatanyan I (Հակոբ Հովնաթանյան) (died in 1757) – artist, miniaturist, and poet
Hovnatan Hovnatanyan (Հովնաթան Հովնաթանյան) (1730s – 1801/1802) – wall-painter
Mkrtum Hovnatanyan (Մկրտում Հովնաթանյան) (1779 —1846) – artist, buried in Khojivank cemetery, Tbilisi.
Aghaton Hovnatanyan (Աղաթոն Հովնաթանյան) (1816–1893) - artist
Hakob Hovnatanyan II (Հակոբ Հովնաթանյան) (1806—1881) – artist
Ruben Hovnatanyan (1940-1999) - artist

Legacy
A crater on the planet Mercury is named after Hakob Hovnatanian.

Gallery

References

 Նախիջևան` Գլուխ հինգերորդ

See also 
 Armenian culture

Russian artists
Iranian artists
Armenian families
Armenian painters
Burials at Armenian Pantheon of Tbilisi